Henry Dexter may refer to:

 Henry Morton Dexter (1846–1910), American clergyman, historian, and editor
 Henry Dexter (sculptor) (1806–1876), American sculptor 
 Henry Martyn Dexter (1821–1890), American Congregational clergyman and author
 Harry Dexter, founder of the American News Company